High Range is a locality located in the Southern Highlands of New South Wales, Australia near Bowral and Mittagong. High Range has a church (St Thomas), a rural fire station, a bus stop and a cricket pitch.

It is a rural area with a number of vineyards.

Population
At the 2021 census, the population was 497.

See also
 Taralga

References

External links
 Wingecaribee Shire Council - Administering and Based in Moss Vale

Towns of the Southern Highlands (New South Wales)